Nothing to Make a Fuss About is a 1953 novel by the French writer Roger Nimier. The narrative is set in Paris right after World War I. It tells the story of a female ex-ambulance driver with a passion for the arts, who falls in love with a disillusioned Austrian painter, while she in turn is adored by a young woman. The novel was published in English in 1954, as part of an omnibus volume titled Children of Circumstance.

The novel was the basis for the 1961 film Time Out for Love. The film was directed by Jean Valère and stars Micheline Presle, Maurice Ronet and Jean Seberg.

References

External links
 Publicity page at the French publisher's website 

1953 French novels
French novels adapted into films
French-language novels
Novels by Roger Nimier
Novels set in Paris